Marshfield is a village in the town of Marshfield in Washington County, Vermont, United States. The population was 229 at the 2020 census.

Geography

Demographics

As of the census of 2000, there were 262 people, 96 households, and 72 families residing in the village.  The population density was 888.5 people per square mile (348.8/km2).  There were 112 housing units at an average density of 379.8/sq mi (149.1/km2).  The racial makeup of the village was 98.09% White, 0.38% Asian, and 1.53% from two or more races. Hispanic or Latino of any race were 0.76% of the population.

There were 96 households, out of which 38.5% had children under the age of 18 living with them, 57.3% were married couples living together, 13.5% had a female householder with no husband present, and 25.0% were non-families. 20.8% of all households were made up of individuals, and 5.2% had someone living alone who was 65 years of age or older.  The average household size was 2.73 and the average family size was 3.10.

In the village, the population was spread out, with 27.5% under the age of 18, 14.9% from 18 to 24, 26.7% from 25 to 44, 21.4% from 45 to 64, and 9.5% who were 65 years of age or older.  The median age was 33 years. For every 100 females, there were 97.0 males.  For every 100 females age 18 and over, there were 100.0 males.

The median income for a household in the village was $43,542, and the median income for a family was $42,188. Males had a median income of $31,000 versus $24,375 for females. The per capita income for the village was $14,156.  About 9.2% of families and 7.0% of the population were below the poverty line, including 9.4% of those under the age of eighteen and none of those 65 or over.

References

Incorporated villages in Vermont
 Marshfield
Villages in Washington County, Vermont